In2TV was a website offering ad-supported streaming video of classic TV shows in the USA only. It was operated by AOL Time Warner as an outlet for the company's archival television programming.

History

In2TV was announced in November 2005 as a collaboration of AOL and Warner Bros. Television, at the time both being owned by the AOL Time Warner conglomerate. The site was created in part as a counteraction against the rapid rise in popularity of video hosting sites such as YouTube; when In2TV launched, Time Warner subsequently ordered all of its content (mostly posted by users, not by Time Warner itself) off YouTube through Digital Millennium Copyright Act notices in order to divert traffic to In2TV.  The service launched in March 2006 and was later integrated with AOL Video in December 2006.

Content

When In2TV first launched the shows were categorized into channels. These included LOL (Comedy), Drama Rama (Drama), What a Rush (Action), Vintage TV (Classic), Heroes Horror (Sci-Fi/Horror), Toon Topia TV (Cartoons) and Pilot Theater (first episodes).

In2TV also included bonus channels featuring original content based on the TV shows featured on the service. These channels included:

 Starplay, featuring stars before they were stars
 Betcha Didn't Know!, trivia about top TV stars
 TV Karaoke, theme-song sing-alongs
 Where Are They Now, updates on stars of past series
 Rock 'n Flix, musical clips from movies

After the move to AOL video in December 2006, the channels were dropped and the shows were put into more generic categories such as Animation, Comedy, Drama, Reality, Sci-Fi, Secret Agent, Urban and en Espanol.

AOL Video lost its rights to the Time Warner library when AOL Time Warner broke apart in 2009 to form AOL, Time Warner, and Time Warner Cable. By the time AOL had purchased The Huffington Post in 2011, AOL Video had been dissolved. Links to the service now redirect to Huffington Post's TV section, which contains no archival video.

What remains of In2TV's content was moved over to online platforms bearing the brands of the now-defunct The WB and Kids' WB.

References

American entertainment websites
Video hosting
Former video hosting services
Defunct online companies of the United States